Murafa is a river in Ukraine, a left tributary of the Dniester. The Murafa river finds its source near the village of Zatoky in Bar Raion, Vinnytsia Oblast. It flows into the Dniester near Yampil.

References

 Географічна енциклопедія України: в 3-х томах / Редколегія: О. М. Маринич (відпов. ред.) та ін. — К.: «Українська радянська енциклопедія» імені М. П. Бажана, 1989.

Rivers of Vinnytsia Oblast